The meridian 92° west of Greenwich is a line of longitude that extends from the North Pole across the Arctic Ocean, North America, the Gulf of Mexico, Central America, the Pacific Ocean, the Southern Ocean, and Antarctica to the South Pole.

The 92nd meridian west forms a great circle with the 88th meridian east.

From Pole to Pole
Starting at the North Pole and heading south to the South Pole, the 92nd meridian west passes through:

{| class="wikitable plainrowheaders"
! scope="col" width="120" | Co-ordinates
! scope="col" | Country, territory or sea
! scope="col" | Notes
|-valign="top"
| style="background:#b0e0e6;" | 
! scope="row" style="background:#b0e0e6;" | Arctic Ocean
| style="background:#b0e0e6;" | Passing just west of Ellesmere Island, Nunavut,  (at ) Passing just west of Krueger Island, Nunavut,  (at )
|-
| 
! scope="row" | 
| Nunavut — Fjeldholmen Island
|-
| style="background:#b0e0e6;" | 
! scope="row" style="background:#b0e0e6;" | Nansen Sound
| style="background:#b0e0e6;" |
|-
| 
! scope="row" | 
| Nunavut — Axel Heiberg Island
|-
| style="background:#b0e0e6;" | 
! scope="row" style="background:#b0e0e6;" | Norwegian Bay
| style="background:#b0e0e6;" |
|-
| 
! scope="row" | 
| Nunavut — Devon Island
|-
| style="background:#b0e0e6;" | 
! scope="row" style="background:#b0e0e6;" | Parry Channel
| style="background:#b0e0e6;" | Barrow Strait
|-
| 
! scope="row" | 
| Nunavut — Somerset Island
|-
| style="background:#b0e0e6;" | 
! scope="row" style="background:#b0e0e6;" | Prince Regent Inlet
| style="background:#b0e0e6;" |
|-
| style="background:#b0e0e6;" | 
! scope="row" style="background:#b0e0e6;" | Gulf of Boothia
| style="background:#b0e0e6;" |
|-
| 
! scope="row" | 
| Nunavut — Boothia Peninsula (mainland)
|-
| style="background:#b0e0e6;" | 
! scope="row" style="background:#b0e0e6;" | Gulf of Boothia
| style="background:#b0e0e6;" | Lord Mayor Bay
|-
| 
! scope="row" | 
| Nunavut — mainland
|-
| style="background:#b0e0e6;" | 
! scope="row" style="background:#b0e0e6;" | Hudson Bay
| style="background:#b0e0e6;" | Rankin Inlet
|-
| 
! scope="row" | 
| Nunavut — mainland
|-
| style="background:#b0e0e6;" | 
! scope="row" style="background:#b0e0e6;" | Hudson Bay
| style="background:#b0e0e6;" |
|-valign="top"
| 
! scope="row" | 
| Manitoba Ontario — from 
|-
| 
! scope="row" | 
| Minnesota
|-
| style="background:#b0e0e6;" | 
! scope="row" style="background:#b0e0e6;" | Lake Superior
| style="background:#b0e0e6;" |
|-valign="top"
| 
! scope="row" | 
|-
| style="background:#b0e0e6;" | 
! scope="row" style="background:#b0e0e6;" | Gulf of Mexico
| style="background:#b0e0e6;" |
|-valign="top"
| 
! scope="row" | 
| Campeche Tabasco — from  Chiapas — from 
|-
| 
! scope="row" | 
|
|-
| style="background:#b0e0e6;" | 
! scope="row" style="background:#b0e0e6;" | Pacific Ocean
| style="background:#b0e0e6;" |
|-
| style="background:#b0e0e6;" | 
! scope="row" style="background:#b0e0e6;" | Southern Ocean
| style="background:#b0e0e6;" |
|-
| 
! scope="row" | Antarctica
| Unclaimed territory
|}

See also
91st meridian west
93rd meridian west

w092 meridian west